Norman J. Grossfeld (born December 15, 1963) is an American director, television producer, record producer, screenwriter and media executive.  From February 1994 to December 2009, he was the president of 4Kids Productions, a former subsidiary of 4Kids Entertainment and Leisure Concepts. He produced the English adaptations of the first eight seasons of the Pokémon TV series and five seasons of Yu-Gi-Oh!.  He produced five seasons of the new Teenage Mutant Ninja Turtles, five Pokémon movies, and one Yu-Gi-Oh! movie for 4KidsTV. In addition to producing and executive producing, Grossfeld co-wrote most of the Pokémon films, which grossed over $600 million worldwide. Grossfeld is credited with writing the Pokémon franchise's tagline, "Gotta catch 'em all!" He was also an executive producer for the anime One Piece.

An accomplished lyricist and musician, Grossfeld contributed to several tracks on the Pokémon 2.B.A. Master soundtrack album, the first released for the English localization of the Pokémon anime. The album was a commercial success, rising to the top of the US Billboard Kids Albums Chart and garnering RIAA Gold certification with over 500,000 units sold. He also wrote both the main and ending theme songs for Sonic X and Kirby: Right Back at Ya!, and the English ending theme song to Pokémon: Jirachi Wish Maker.

Grossfeld also developed and co-wrote the successful stage adaptation of the Pokémon series, which premiered at Radio City Music Hall and toured the United States and Canada in late 2000 to early 2001.

Before his role as president of 4Kids, Grossfeld was a producer and director at Television Programming Enterprises from 1988 to 1991, worked at NBC Sports from 1991 to 1992 as a coordinating director, and spent 1992 through 1994 as president of the television production company Gold Coast Television Entertainment.

Grossfeld broke new ground in reality television with NBC's InSport, a show that set the stage for sports magazine series now on the air. Grossfeld has also produced, written and/or directed a variety of television programs, including Lifestyles of the Rich and Famous hosted by Robin Leach.

A member of the Directors Guild of America, Grossfeld directed coverage of several Olympic Games for NBC, including the 1992 Summer Olympics in Barcelona, the 1996 Summer Olympics in Atlanta and the 1998 Winter Olympics in Nagano. In 1996, Grossfeld won the International Olympic Committee's highest honor, the Golden Rings, for his direction of the live sports coverage of the 1996 Olympic Games.

Grossfeld is of Jewish background.

Filmography

Movies

Television

See also
 Alfred R. Kahn

References

External links 
https://www.imdb.com/name/nm0343570/

Living people
Jewish American screenwriters
American television producers
American film producers
American male screenwriters
American television writers
Showrunners
American entertainment industry businesspeople
20th-century American businesspeople
21st-century American businesspeople
Tisch School of the Arts alumni
1963 births
American male television writers
20th-century American Jews
21st-century American Jews